The Ministry of Planning and Territory (MPO;) is the government department of East Timor accountable for the economic and social development of the country.

Functions
The Ministry is responsible for the design, coordination and evaluation of policy for the promotion of economic and social development of East Timor, through strategic and integrated planning and rationalization of available financial resources. The Ministry also has specific responsibilities on the implementation of the country's Strategic Development Plan, especially with regard to infrastructure and Urban Planning, Petroleum and Minerals, Planning and Territory.

Minister
The incumbent Minister of Planning and Territory is José Maria dos Reis, Deputy Prime Minister of East Timor.

See also 
 Politics of East Timor

References

External links

  

Planning and Territory
East Timor
East Timor, Planning and Territory
2002 establishments in East Timor